Ömer Engin Lütem, (1933, Istanbul, Turkey - 6 January 2018) was a Turkish writer, diplomat, researcher and lecturer.

Life

Education 
Ambassador Ömer Engin Lütem graduated from Galatasaray High School, then studied Political Sciences at Ankara University in 1957 and started his career as a diplomat in the same year.

Ministry of Foreign Affairs 
He held different positions in the Ministry of Foreign Affairs during his service. Some of his duties included Consul General at Cologne, Germany between 1975 and 1979, Director General of Intelligence and Research from 1981 until 1983. Also he had four high-level diplomatic posts; Ambassador to Bulgaria (1983 - 1989), Deputy Undersecretary of the Ministry (1989 - 1992), Ambassador to Vatican (1992 - 1995) and the Permanent Representative to UNESCO (1995 - 1997).

Post retirement 
Lütem retired in 1998 and served as the Director of the Institute for Armenian Research at Eurasian Strategic Research Center (2000 - 2008) and Director of the Center for Eurasian Studies (2009 - 2012). He was also the editor in chief of the journals Armenian Studies, Review of Armenian Studies, and International Crimes and History.

Lütem died on 6 January 2018.

Writing Works 

 Turkish-Bulgarian Relations, 1983 - 1989 Volume 1, ASAM, Ankara, 2000
 Balkan Diplomacy, ASAM, Ankara 2001
 Handbook of the Armenian Question, ASAM-TEİMK, Ankara, 2003
 Turkish-Bulgarian Relations, 1983 - 1989 Volume 2, ASAM, Ankara, 2005
 Armenian Terror, ASAM, Ankara, 2007
 Armenian Question: Basic Knowledge and Documentation, AVİM, Ankara, 2009

See also 
Center for Eurasian Studies

Ömer Engin Lütem's Articles for AVIM

Institute of Armenian Research

References 

1933 births
20th-century Turkish diplomats
Ambassadors of Turkey to Bulgaria
Ambassadors of Turkey to the Holy See
2018 deaths
20th-century Turkish male writers
Galatasaray High School alumni
Ankara University alumni